The Quinault Canyon is a submarine canyon, off Washington state, in Olympic Coast National Marine Sanctuary.

The area

It lies opposite the Quinault Reservation.

From the map, it is clear the Quinault River drains into the Pacific Ocean, opposite Quinault Canyon. The north of the Copalis National Wildlife Refuge is also a bit east, as are a few cities and sites, as Kalaloch, Queets, Taholah, Point Grenville (a headland), Moclips, and Pacific Beach. Also, Quinault, Washington and Lake Quinault are both onshore.

The canyon is dynamic area where humans do not detect massive submarine landslides which occur on its steep side walls, and the bottom collects sediment deposited from above.

Its dimensions

Nearby submarine canyons

All of the following submarine canyons are near, headed north to south:

 Clayoquot Canyon
 Father Charles Canyon
 Loudon Canyon
 Barkely Canyon
 Nitinat Canyon
 Juan de Fuca Canyon
 Quileute Canyon
 Quinault Canyon
 Grays Canyon
 Guide Canyon
 Willapa Canyon
 Astoria Canyon
Of local submarine canyons, Quinault canyon is deepest.

Quinault Canyon's relationships to volcanic eruptions

Both the 1980 eruption of Mount Saint Helens and the eruption of Mount Mazama in about 5677 BC left turbidites, in Quinault Canyon.

On Quinault Canyon's role as a pathway

Quinault Canyon has acted as a funnel for north- and northwestward-moving sediment along Washington’s continental shelf, and it is a major pathway between the continental shelf of Washington and deep sea. Silt and clay originating from the Columbia River move down Quinault Canyon.

On Quinault Canyon's aquatic life

It also serves as a conduit for dense, cold, nutrient-rich seawater pulling toward shore, where upwelling feeds surface productivity at the base of the food web.

Due to productive topographically induced upwelling that occurs, Quinault Canyon is important for many fish, invertebrate, and whales. High relief is offered by boulders, vertical walls, and ridges. Rockfish have used this. As of June 14, 2016, there has been low sampling, but there are 14 records of

corals, 
sponges, and 
pennatulids, including black coral and glass sponge.

Quinault Channel

A deep-sea channel, Quinault Channel, connects Quinault Canyon to Cascadia Channel.

Exploration of Quinault Canyon

As of August 2017, there is an expedition to explore Quinault Canyon, something never before done. Results are forthcoming. Remotely operated underwater vehicles or autonomous underwater vehicles have never before explored Quinault and Quileute Canyons. These canyons are of great interest.

The mission is to map  habitats that support many of the Quinault Nation’s treaty fisheries, sample for harmful algal blooms, to map the ocean floor, to check oxygen levels, and investigate ocean acidification.

Methane seeps

Methane seeps have been found, inside and near Quinault Canyon.

See also

Local geography

 Abyssal fan
 Astoria Canyon
 Astoria Fan
 Cascadia Basin
 Cascadia Channel
 Cascadia Subduction Zone
 Grays Canyon
 Juan de Fuca Canyon
 Juan de Fuca Plate
 Juan de Fuca Channel
 Nitinat Canyon
 Nitinat Fan
 Quileute Canyon
 Willapa Canyon

Other useful links related to the name Quinault

 Lake Quinault
 Quinault Cultural Center and Museum
 Quinault River, a river located on the Olympic Peninsula in the U.S. state of Washington
 Quinault Pass
 Quinault Indian Nation
 Quinault language
 Quinault National Fish Hatchery
 Quinault people, an Indigenous people of the Pacific Northwest Coast
 Quinault Rainforest
 Quinault, Washington
Quinault Indian Nation, a federally recognized tribe
Quinault language, their language
 Quinault Treaty, signed in 1855
 SS Quinault Victory

References

External links
 Columbia River sediment confirmed, in Quinault Canyon
 Turbidite paleoseismology, earthquakes
 More on earthquakes, turbidites
 On mapping the Quinault Canyon seafloor
 More on the exploration of Quinault Canyon
 And more on the exploration of Quinault Canyon

Geography of the Pacific Northwest
Submarine canyons of the Pacific Ocean
Quinault places
Quinault